Equitable Building may refer to:

 Equitable Building (Denver)
 Equitable Building (Atlanta)
 Equitable Building (Atlanta 1892)
 Equitable Building (Chicago)
 Equitable Building (Des Moines)
 Equitable Building (Baltimore), one of the tallest buildings in Baltimore
 Equitable Building (Manhattan)
 Commonwealth Building (Portland, Oregon) or Equitable Building

See also
 Axa Equitable Center, also known as the Axa Equitable Building
 Equitable Co-operative Building Association, Washington, DC
 Equitable Life Building (disambiguation)
 Palais Equitable, Vienna